Valentina Iovovna Dmitryeva (May 10, 1859 – February 18, 1947) was a Russian writer, teacher, medical doctor and revolutionary.

Early life
Dmitryeva was born in the village of Voronino, in the Saratov Governorate of the Russian Empire, where her father was a serf. He had been sent to an agricultural school by his master and was subsequently made the overseer of his master's estate. Her mother, Anna passed on her love of literature to Dmitryeva. After the Emancipation reform of 1861 the family was reduced to poverty and a transient existence.

As a girl, Dmitryeva read everything she could find, from borrowed books to discarded newspapers. She kept a diary, using scraps of paper and old envelopes. She maintained the diary from the age of 10 to 23, when it was confiscated in a police search. The family eventually went to live in the household of Dmitryeva's maternal grandfather. As a teenage girl in her grandfather's home, she was confined to the traditional role of girls in Russian society of the time, limiting her to household tasks such as sewing and cooking, while her brother was sent to study with the son of a rich landowner. She was able to study secretly using books given to her by her brother's tutor.

In 1873 she was admitted to the Tambov Girl's Secondary School. She worked her way through school by doing tutoring jobs, and with the help of one of her teachers. She graduated in 1877. By the time of her graduation she had become radicalized, and was writing reviews of works by leading critical thinkers like Nikolay Mikhaylovsky, Gleb Uspensky and Nikolay Dobrolyubov for her reading and discussion group in Tambov.

Career
After graduating she took a job as a teacher in a village school, one of the few positions open to women, and published articles in the press about the poor state of public education. She was dismissed from her post after writing a critical letter to the authorities, and prohibited from teaching. Unable to teach, she decided to pursue a medical career.

She entered the Women's Medical Courses in Saint Petersburg in 1878. This program owed its existence to the influence of the Minister of War Dmitry Milyutin, who was an advocate of medical education for women. Dmitryeva spent almost as much time aiding revolutionary activists as she did on her studies, allowing her room to be used for storing illegal literature and as a safe house for wanted revolutionaries. Her connections, which included members of Narodnaya Volya, led to her arrest in 1880, and a short term of imprisonment in the Peter and Paul Fortress. After the arrest and disappearance of most of her friends in the early 1880s, and finding herself in difficult financial circumstances, she turned increasingly to writing. She graduated from the Medical Courses in 1886, and studied obstetrics and gynaecology in Moscow until 1887.

In 1887 she was arrested and imprisoned for participating in student demonstrations, and was later exiled to Tver for four years with her sister, where she was under police surveillance. In 1892 she moved to Voronezh with her husband, who had also served time in confinement for revolutionary activities.

She found work as a doctor during outbreaks of cholera (1892–1893), and diphtheria, typhus and scarlet fever in 1894. During her time treating these epidemics, she stood up to local authorities, demanding a decent salary, badly needed equipment and sober staff, which had been denied to her and other women doctors.

Dmitryeva became a full-time writer in 1895. She and her husband lived in Voronezh until 1917, while making occasional trips to Moscow, Saint Petersburg and Europe. During the Russian Civil War she fled to Sochi after losing her mother and 3 brothers to cold and starvation. She nearly died of starvation herself, and lost her husband who died after being imprisoned by the Bolsheviks. During the Soviet period she devoted her time to the cause of literacy, and to writing memoirs and children's stories. She died in Sochi in 1947.

Literary work
Dmitryeva made her literary debut in 1877 as a writer of peasant stories at a time when educated Russians were eager to learn about peasants and rural life. Her first story To Seek Justice appeared in a newspaper in Saratov. Her story Akhmetka's Wife (1881) attracted favorable attention from critics and praise from Nadezhda Khvoshchinskaya, an established woman writer. Dmitryeva's works treated a wide variety of settings and characters. Besides rural Russia, her stories cover Ukraine, the Crimea and the Caucasus.

In the course of her literary career she met Maxim Gorky, Leonid Andreyev, Vikenty Veresayev, and other well-known writers. Her works were published in the journals Russian Thought, The Herald of Europe and Russian Wealth. Her most popular work was the children's story A Boy and His Dog (1899) which went through more than twenty editions. She wrote an autobiography published in 1901; an expanded edition, titled Tak bylo (The Way It Was), was published in 1930.

English translations 
Love's Anvil: A Romance of Northern Russia (novel, tr. of Gomochka [1894]), Stanley Paul, London, 1921
Hveska, The Doctor's Watchman, (short story), from In the Depths: Russian Stories, Raduga Publishers, 1987.
After the Great Hunger, (excerpt), from Anthology of Russian Women's Writing, 1777–1992, Catriona Kelly, Oxford University Press, 1994.

References 

1859 births
1947 deaths
People from Saratov Oblast
People from Balashovsky Uyezd
Novelists from the Russian Empire
Soviet novelists
Women writers from the Russian Empire
Soviet short story writers
Russian children's writers
Russian women children's writers
Soviet women writers
Physicians from the Russian Empire
Women physicians from the Russian Empire
Educators from the Russian Empire
Memoirists from the Russian Empire
Russian Empire prisoners and detainees
Women memoirists
19th-century women physicians
Soviet women novelists